Rösselsprung was a plan by the German Kriegsmarine to intercept an Arctic convoy in mid-1942. It was the German Navy's largest operation of its type and arguably the most successful since it resulted in the near-destruction of Convoy PQ 17. Ironically, that success was entirely indirect, as no Rösselsprung ship caught sight of the convoy or fired a shot at it. PQ 17's losses were instead caused by U-boat and aircraft attacks. Despite not making contact with the convoy a number of the Rösselsprung ships were damaged in the course of the operation, notably the heavy cruiser Lützow, which ran aground in thick fog and needed three months of repairs.

Background
The name Rösselsprung refers to the Knight’s Move in Chess.
It was an attempt to intercept the arctic convoy expected in late June 1942, which would be PQ 17.

A patrol line of U-boats was established in the Norwegian Sea north-east of Jan Mayen island; code-named Eisteufel (Ice Devil), the group comprised six boats and increased later to eight.

An advance line of three boats was also established in the Denmark Strait, east of Iceland, to give early warning of the convoy's departure.

The plan was that when the convoy was sighted, the two battle groups would move north and concentrate at Altenfjord, where they would re-fuel and await the order to attack with the aim to intercept the convoy in the region of Bear Island.

However, Rösselsprung was handicapped by a complex command process, with authority to go at each stage resting with Hitler himself and a contradictory mission statement; the forces were instructed not only to attack and destroy the convoy but also to avoid any action that would lead to damage to the capital ships, particularly Tirpitz. That would prove fatal to the success of the mission.

Action
PQ 17 left Hvalfjörður on 27 June 1942 but it was not detected by the advance patrol. No warning of PQ 17 was raised until 1 July, when it was spotted by U-456 of Eisteufel; by this time the convoy was already past Jan Mayen Island, and was closing with QP 13.

With the complex decision-making process binding, Rösselsprung no move was made until 2 July; Tirpitz, Hipper and four destroyers left Trondheim at 20:00 on 2 July, while Lutzow and Scheer with their five destroyers left Narvik at 12:30 on the 3rd. The journeys were taken through channels between the Norwegian Islands and the main coastline, sometimes known as the Western Leads. The Leads are sheltered and hidden but tricky to navigate, and the battle groups encountered trouble almost immediately; three of Tirpitzs escorting destroyers ran onto rocks and were forced to return to port. Tirpitz and Hipper with one remaining destroyer arrived at Vestfjord, off Narvik, on 3 July and at Altenfjord at 10 Am on 4 July. Kummetz’s battle group also had trouble. Lutzow ran aground in Tjel Sund and was also forced to retire, Kummetz shifting his flag to Scheer; they also arrived at Altenfjord on the 4th.

Meanwhile, the movement by Tirpitz and Hipper northward had been detected by Allied Intelligence, and in response to the threat the British Admiralty took the controversial decision to scatter the convoy, which commenced at 22:15 on 4 July. Without the mutual protection provided by sailing in convoy, the ships would be easy prey to the aircraft and U-boats that would beset them. Over the next six days, 20 ships would be lost, totalling 24 from the convoy altogether.

German intelligence B-Dienst quickly realized that the convoy was scattering, and Schniewind requested permission to sortie. Again, the extended chain of command hindered movement, permission not being received until 15:00 on 5 July and then only with the caveat to avoid any action with the Allied capital ships. The U-boats of Eisteufel were instructed to leave the attack on the convoy ships to concentrate on finding and attacking the Home Fleet, particularly the carrier .

At 15:00, the fleet, now consisting of Tirpitz, Hipper and Scheer, with seven destroyers and two torpedo boats as escort, left Altenfjord and headed northwest toward the ships of PQ 17.

Almost immediately, they were sighted by the Soviet submarine K-21, commanded by Commander Nikolai Lunin, who sent a sighting report. They attacked the fleet and claimed a hit on Tirpitz, but it is not confirmed by Western sources. An hour later, the fleet was sighted by a British Catalina and again after another two hours by British submarine .

Both sighting reports were detected by B-Dienst, and at 21:30, Erich Raeder, concerned that the fleet was steaming into a trap, ordered a recall just six hours after it had set out.

Conclusion
Despite indirectly causing the catastrophic losses to PQ 17, the Rösselsprung operation was a disappointing performance by the German capital ships. Also, Tirpitz, Lutzow and the three destroyers spent a considerable time in dock for repairs. That made the Kriegsmarine unable to mount such an extensive operation again in the Arctic campaign, and it never saw a comparable naval success.

References
 
 

Conflicts in 1942
Arctic naval operations of World War II
Arctic convoys of World War II
Naval battles of World War II involving Germany
Military operations of World War II